USCGC Chase can refer to the following ships of the United States Coast Guard:

 , was a  launched in 1967, entered service in 1968 and was taken out of service in 2011. The vessel was then transferred to the Nigerian Navy and renamed NNS Thunder.
 , is a   that is under construction.

See also
 , a side-wheel steamer of the United States Revenue-Marine
 , a training ship of the United States Revenue Cutter Service
 , ships by the name for the U.S. Navy

United States Coast Guard ship names